Vicente Borge González (born 23 October 1968) is a Spanish retired footballer who played as a striker, and a manager.

Playing career
Born in Mieres, Asturias, Borge was a leading scorer in several of the clubs he played for, notably netting 22 Segunda División B goals for CD Lugo in 1997–98 and also scoring regularly with Cádiz CF and Novelda CF. In Segunda División he played for Real Oviedo, Real Burgos CF, Real Avilés, CE Sabadell FC and CP Mérida, amassing totals of 71 games and 20 goals over the course of five seasons and being relegated with the third and fourth teams.

Borge closed out his career at nearly 38 after several years in the third level and the Valencian Community, with Novelda, Hércules CF and Villajoyosa CF. In the 2001–02 campaign, whilst with Hércules, he finished second in Group III's scoring charts at 14, behind joint-winners Luis García and Javier Portillo (both of Real Madrid Castilla) and UD Lanzarote's Jonathan Torres, all with 15.

Coaching career
After hanging up his boots in June 2006 Borge decided to start a managerial career, precisely with his last club Villajoyosa, being relegated from division three in his second season. After a brief spell with Benidorm he signed for yet another Valencian club in the third tier, Alicante CF, meeting exactly the same fate in 2011 but now due to financial irregularities.

In July 2011 Borge returned to Hércules, being appointed at the reserve side due to the good project of the club's sporting director, Sergio Fernández.

Managerial statistics

References

External links

1968 births
Living people
Footballers from Mieres, Asturias
Spanish footballers
Association football forwards
Segunda División players
Segunda División B players
Caudal Deportivo footballers
Real Oviedo Vetusta players
Real Oviedo players
Real Burgos CF footballers
Cultural Leonesa footballers
Real Avilés CF footballers
CE Sabadell FC footballers
CP Mérida footballers
CD Lugo players
Racing de Ferrol footballers
Cádiz CF players
Novelda CF players
Hércules CF players
Villajoyosa CF footballers
Spanish football managers
Alicante CF managers